Chris Palmer (born on 25 August 1947) is a Hong Kong-born English environmental and wildlife film producer and director of the Center for Environmental Filmmaking at American University. He was executive producer for the Oscar nominated film Dolphins. He is author of Shooting in the Wild: An Insider's Account of Making Movies in the Animal Kingdom, Confessions of a Wildlife Filmmaker: The Challenges of Staying Honest in an Industry Where Ratings Are King, and Now What Grad: Your Path to Success After College.

Early life
Born in Hong Kong, Palmer grew up in England, served as an officer in the Royal Navy for seven years, and immigrated to the United States in 1972. He holds a B.S. with First Class Honors in Mechanical Engineering and an M.S. in Ocean Engineering and Naval Architecture from University College London and a Master of Public Administration from Harvard University where he was a Kennedy Scholar and received a Harkness Fellowship.

Career
After his immigration to the United States in 1972, he worked as chief energy advisor to Senator Charles H. Percy. He then served as a political appointee in the Environmental Protection Agency under President Jimmy Carter. In 1983, he founded National Audubon Society Productions, where he served as president and CEO for 11 years. In 1994, he founded the nonprofit National Wildlife Productions (part of the National Wildlife Federation, the largest conservation organization in the United States) which he managed as president and CEO for 10 years, directing NWF's launch into broadcast, cable, IMAX, and other media markets. He is a professor in the American University School of Communication.  He publishes articles regularly (including a bimonthly column for Realscreen Magazine) and currently serves on the boards of fourteen non-profits.

Film and television production
Since the early 1980s, Palmer has been actively involved in film and television production, specializing in environmental and wildlife filmmaking. His films have been broadcast on the Disney Channel, TBS, PBS, Animal Planet, and other channels. Palmer has executive produced several IMAX films with MacGillivray Freeman Films, including Coral Reef Adventure and Dolphins. Dolphins was nominated for the 2000 Academy Award for Best Short Subject Documentary. His other IMAX film include Bears, Wolves, and Whales, "To The Arctic 3D", and "Journey to the South Pacific 3D". In 2004, Palmer was named president of the MacGillivray Freeman Films Educational Foundation, which produces and funds IMAX films and companion educational outreach materials and programs.

Teaching
In August 2004, Palmer joined the full-time faculty of American University as Distinguished Film Producer in Residence. At American, he founded the Center for Environmental Filmmaking. He continues to serve as director of the Center for Environmental Filmmaking while also teaching classes in the School of Communication.

Palmer is a frequent speaker at conferences and film festivals and gives workshops on such subjects as effective networking and giving effective presentations. In 2010, he was a featured speaker at the Environmental Film Festival in Washington, DC as well as at the Jackson Hole Wildlife Film Festival in Jackson Hole, Wyoming. He has been interviewed on The Today Show and The Fox News Channel and in May, 2010, appeared on the Diane Rehm Show as a guest panelist. His book, Shooting in the Wild: An Insider's Account of Making Movies in the Animal Kingdom was published in 2010 by Sierra Club Books and has received critical acclaim for being "a sharp and searching assessment of the contemporary wildlife media universe from someone who loves the field and wants to see it live up to its promise." On 1 March 2012.  In the book Palmer said, "You have to send your kids to college, you want to retire with some money. You cannot go back with dull footage. When you're under that pressure, and the weather is closing in, ethics is the last thing in your mind."  His book was recently made into a public television documentary entitled "Shooting in the Wild", and was narrated by Alexandra Cousteau.  Palmer was a guest panelist on the Kojo Nnamdi Show.

Awards
In 1994, Palmer received the Frank G. Wells Award for ongoing commitment to environmental protection from the Environmental Media Association. In 2009, he was honored with the Lifetime Achievement Award for Media at the International Wildlife Film Festival.
Palmer was recognized in 2010 as the "Environmental Film Educator of the Decade" at the Green Globe Film Awards. Palmer received the International Wildlife Film Festival's first-ever "IWFF Wildlife Hero of the Year Award" on 13 May 2011 in Missoula, Montana at the 34th annual award ceremony.  In 2012, he was named the recipient of the Ronald B. Tobias Award for Achievement in Science and Natural History Filmmaking Education. In 2015, Palmer received a Lifetime Achievement Award at the International Wildlife Film Festival.

Personal life
Palmer lives in Bethesda, Maryland. He is married to Gail Shearer and is father to three grown daughters: Kimberly, Christina, and Jennifer. In his free time, he performs stand-up comedy in DC area comedy clubs.

Filmography

Executive producer

References

Further reading
Chris Palmer: Shooting in the Wild: An Insider's Account of Making Movies in the Animal Kingdom, Sierra Club Books, 2010
Chris Palmer: Confessions of a Wildlife Filmmaker: The Challenges of Staying Honest in an Industry Where Ratings Are King, Bluefield Publishing, 2015
Chris Palmer: Now What Grad: Your Path to Success After College, Rowman & Littlefield Publishers, 2015

External links
 Center for Environmental Filmmaking Homepage
 Chris Palmer's Personal Web Page
 

British documentary film producers
British environmentalists
Alumni of University College London
Living people
1947 births
Harvard Kennedy School alumni